Candace 'Candy' DeFazio (born 1950) is a United States lawn bowls international competitor.

Bowls career

World Championship
DeFazio competed at the 2016 World Outdoor Bowls Championship in Christchurch and four years later in 2020 was selected for the 2020 World Outdoor Bowls Championship in Australia.

Asia Pacific
She won a fours silver medal at the 2015 Asia Pacific Bowls Championships in Christchurch, New Zealand.

References

Living people
1950 births
American female bowls players
21st-century American women